A screw-propelled vehicle is a land or amphibious vehicle designed to cope with difficult terrain, such as snow, ice, mud, and swamp. Such vehicles are distinguished by being moved by the rotation of one or more auger-like cylinders fitted with a helical flange that engages with the medium through or over which the vehicle is moving. They have been called Archimedes screw vehicles by the US military, where they are classified as a type of marginal terrain vehicle (MTV). Modern vehicles called Amphirols and other similar vehicles have specialised uses.

The weight of the vehicle is typically borne by one or more pairs of large flanged cylinders; sometimes a single flanged cylinder is used with additional stabilising skis. These cylinders each have a helical spiral flange like the thread of a screw. On each matched pair of cylinders, one will have its flange running clockwise and the other counter-clockwise. The flange engages with the surface on which the vehicle rests. Ideally this should be slightly soft material such as snow, sand or mud so that the flange can get a good bite. An engine is used to counter-rotate the cylinders—one cylinder turns clockwise and the other counter-clockwise. The counter-rotations cancel out so that the vehicle moves forwards (or backwards) along the axis of rotation.

The principle of the operation is the inverse of the screw conveyor. A screw conveyor uses a helical screw to move semi-solid materials horizontally or at a slight incline; in a screw propelled vehicle, the semi-solid substrate remains stationary and the machine itself moves.

Early developments 

One of the earliest examples of a screw-propelled vehicle was designed by Jacob Morath, a native of Switzerland who settled in St. Louis, Missouri in the United States in 1868. Morath's machine was designed for agricultural work such as hauling a plough. The augers were designed with cutting edges so that they would break up roots in the ground as the machine moved.

One of the first screw-propelled vehicles that was actually built was designed by James and Ira Peavey of Maine. It was patented by Ira Peavey in 1907; the Peavey family has been famous for its contributions to the lumber industry ever since blacksmith Joseph Peavey of Stillwater, Maine, invented the tool known to this day as a Peavy. The Peavey Manufacturing Co. is still located in Maine.

The Peaveys' machine had two pairs of cylinders with an articulation between the pairs to effect steering. At least two prototype vehicles were constructed: one was steam powered the other used a gasoline engine. The prototypes worked well on hard packed snow but failed in soft powder because the flanges had nothing to grip into. The machine was designed to haul logs, but its length and rigid construction meant that it had difficulty with the uneven winter roads for which it was intended. Peavey's invention could not compete with the Lombard Steam Log Hauler built by Alvin Lombard and it was not produced commercially. (The Lombard vehicle was an early example of a half-track vehicle, it resembled a railway locomotive with a sled or wheels in front for steering and caterpillar tracks for traction.)

Armstead Snow Motor 

In the 1920s the Armstead Snow Motor was developed. This was used to convert a Fordson tractor into a screw-propelled vehicle with a single pair of cylinders. A machine used in the Truckee,CA area was referred to by locals as the "Snow Devil" and that name has been erroneously attached to these machines, although no known advertising of the time referred to them as such. A film was made to show the capabilities of the vehicle as well as a Chevrolet car fitted with an Armstead Snow Motor. The film clearly shows that the vehicle copes well in snow. Steering was effected by having each cylinder receive power from a separate clutch which, depending on the position of the steering gear, engages and disengages; this results in a vehicle that is relatively maneuverable. The promotional film shows the Armstead snow motor hauling 20 tons of logs.

In January 1926, Time magazine reported:

An extant example is in the collection of the Hays Antique Truck Museum in Woodland, California. This particular vehicle is said to have been used to haul mail from Truckee to North Lake Tahoe.

The Second World War period 

With the occupation of Norway by Nazi Germany in World War II, the quixotic Geoffrey Pyke considered the problem of transporting soldiers rapidly over snow. He proposed the development of a screw-propelled vehicle based on the Armstead snow motor. Pyke envisaged that the vehicles would be used by a small force of highly mobile soldiers. The damage and casualties that a small force could inflict might be slight, but they would oblige the enemy to keep many men stationed in Norway in order to guard against every possible point of attack. Pyke's ideas were initially rejected, but in October 1941, Louis Mountbatten became Chief of Combined Operations and Pyke's ideas received a more sympathetic hearing. Mountbatten became convinced that Pyke's plan was worthwhile and adopted it. The scheme became Project Plough and many high-level conferences were dedicated to it.

The problem of developing a suitable vehicle was passed to the Americans, and Pyke went to the US to oversee the development. However, Pyke, who could be very inflexible, fell out with various individuals on the project and the Americans moved on to design a more conventional tracked vehicle, the M29 Weasel.

In 1944, Johannes Raedel, a soldier of the German Army and veteran of the Eastern Front invented his schraubenantrieb schneemaschine (screw-propelled snow machine). Raedel had seen the problems of operating tracked vehicles in the deep snows of Russia where a tank would dig out the snow under the tracks leaving the tank stuck on the snow compressed under the hull.

According to Siegfried Raedel, son of Johannes:

Amphibians 

The threaded cylinders are necessarily large to ensure a substantial area of contact and buoyancy. Being lightweight, the cylinders may conveniently serve as floats and the arrangement may be used in the design of an amphibious vehicle.

During the Vietnam War, the American Waterways Experiment Station (WES) tested the Marsh Screw Amphibian, designed by the Chrysler Corporation. The vehicle's barge-like hull was built of aluminum. It was fitted with vertical supports at the four corners that supported the two rotating, bladed drums. The vehicle weighed under 2,500 pounds and could carry a 1,000 pound load. The Marsh Screw Amphibian proved fastest on packed snow, where it could exceed . The vehicle "failed miserably on soil surfaces, especially sand" where it traveled only ."

Despite such disappointing results, Chrysler produced a much larger vehicle, the Riverine Utility Craft (RUC) for the Navy in 1969. The RUC travelled on two aluminium rotors,  in diameter. Again, however, speeds on firm soils proved disappointing, reaching only  and crossing dykes proved difficult – the vehicle would get stuck. It was powered with two Chrysler marine V-8 engines and pair of two-speed automatic transmissions.

The Soviets built a screw-propelled vehicle, the ZIL-2906, specifically for the challenging task of recovering cosmonauts who landed in inaccessible areas.

In the 1960s, Joseph Jean de Bakker was the busy owner of the De Bakker machine factory in Hulst in the southwest of the Netherlands. He was also a keen fisherman, but he did not want his fishing time to be constrained by the vagaries of the tide. His solution was the Amphirol, a screw-propelled vehicle superficially similar to the Marsh Screw Amphibian. The Amphirol was able to convey him over the sticky clay revealed by the outgoing tide and to swim in water at high tide.

Also, when moving sideways, steering is effected by shifting the front of the cylinders so that they are no longer parallel – giving a large minimum turning radius.

Amphirols are used for ground surveying, for grooving the surface of newly drained polders to assist drying, and to carry soil-drilling teams.

Today modern vehicles, widely known as amphirols, perform specialised tasks such as compacting tailings from industrial processes. The advantage of these machines to tailings densification is that they provide a means to allow water or process liquor to run off without repulping the profile. This approach subsequently largely negates the impact of rainfall on densification and dewatering. However, the lighter, faster machines are better suited to marginal terrain access, but not densification due to repulping and their limited penetration depth. The process of using these machines specifically for tailings and dredge spoil densification is commonly termed "mud farming" in the mining industry.

Recent developments 

The British Ice Challenger exploration team used a screw drive in their Snowbird 6 vehicle (a modified Bombardier tracked craft) to traverse the ice floes in the Bering Strait. The rotating cylinders allowed Snowbird 6 to move over ice and to propel itself through water, but the screw system was not considered suitable for long distances, and the cylinders could be raised so that the vehicle could also run on conventional caterpillar tracks. The Ice Challenger website says that the design was inspired by a Russian vehicle used to pick up cosmonauts who landed in Siberia (perhaps the ZIL-2906).

Russian inventor Alexey Burdin has come up with a screw-propulsion system "TESH-drive Transformable worms".

More recently, mud farming with larger machines capable of deep profile penetration (termed MudMasters by their manufacturer) has proven to be an efficient method for high intensity tailings management.

See also

References

Notes

General references

Patents

 A screw-propelled sleigh with refinements to keep the screw clear of ice.
 A single-screw, low-speed tractor mechanism.
 A self-propelled sleigh.
 A self-propelled sleigh with open screws.
 A self-propelled amphibious vehicle.
 An adaptation of an automobile to drive on ice and snow.
 An adaptor that can temporarily adapt an automobile to ice and snow.
 A hand-propelled boat with emphasis on safety.
 It is hard to see how these would work!
 An amphibious vehicle for snow, ice tundra etc.
 A screw-driven traction unit used to push or pull a sleigh or skiers.
 A device that can climb up or down steps.
 A tractor for swampy or rough terrain.
 A boat with small screws that allow it to climb onto land.
 A screw-driven vehicle with the option of controlling the angle of the augers and of driving them in the same direction.
 Chrysler Corporation design.
 An amphibious vehicle with non-continuous screws.

 An unusual arrangement with screws at 90 degrees to each other.
 A design for traversing the sea bed.

 An amphibious vehicle able to climb steeply out of the water.
 A peddled powered boat with emphasis on safety.

External links

 

 Flixxy.com video of the Armstead machines

Amphibious vehicles
Off-road vehicles
Vehicle technology
Vehicles by type